John Monteith (November 1, 1948 - January 16, 2018) was an improvisor, writer, actor and director; mainly known for his work with the Monteith and Rand comedy team who had their own Broadway show at the Booth Theater in 1979, produced by James Lipton, after a successful off-Broadway run. Their shows performed for the BBC were repackaged and sold to ABC as Whose Line Is It Anyway?. John graduated from The Second City;  Monteith lived in New York City where he taught and performed. Monteith died on January 16, 2018.

References

1948 births
2018 deaths
Male actors from New York City
Place of birth missing